Anachis is a large genus of sea snails in the family Columbellidae, the dove snails.

Species
, the World Register of Marine Species listed the following species in genus Anachis

 Anachis adelinae G. W. Tryon, 1883 –  West America
 Anachis albonodosa P. P. Carpenter, 1857 – West America
 Anachis aliceae (Pallary, 1900)
 Anachis alliouagana Faber, 2004
 Anachis atkinsoni (Tenison Woods, 1876)
 Anachis atramentaria Sowerby, 1844  – West America
 Anachis aurantia (Lamarck, 1822)
 Anachis avaroides Nordsieck, 1975
 Anachis bacalladoi Espinosa, Ortea & Moro, 2008
 Anachis barazeri K. Monsecour & D. Monsecour, 2018
 Anachis bastionii Pelorce, 2020
 Anachis beachportensis (Verco, 1910)
 Anachis berryi Shasky, 1970 – West America
 Anachis boivini (Kiener, 1841)
 Anachis carloslirae Costa, 1996
 Anachis catenata (G.B. Sowerby, 1844)
 Anachis chuni (Thiele, 1925)
 Anachis cominellaeformis (Tate, 1892)
 Anachis constrictocanalis K. Monsecour & D. Monsecour, 2016
 Anachis coronata (G.B. Sowerby, 1832) – West America
 Anachis coseli Diaz & Mittnacht, 1991
 Anachis costellata (Broderip & Sowerby, 1829) – West America
 Anachis cuspidata (Marrat, 1877)
 Anachis decimdentata Pilsbry & Lowe, 1932
 Anachis delamarrei Rolan & Boyer, 2006
 Anachis delineata Rolan & de Oliveira, 2008
 Anachis demanorum De Jong & Coomans, 1988
 Anachis domlamyi Pelorce, 2020
 Anachis donnae Moolenbeek & Dance, 1994
 Anachis facula K. Monsecour & D. Monsecour, 2016
 Anachis fasciata (G.B. Sowerby I, 1825)
 Anachis fauroti (Jousseaume, 1888)
 Anachis fayae A. M. Keen, 1971 – West America
 Anachis fenestrata (Verco, 1910)
 Anachis fenneli Radwin, 1968 – America
 Anachis fluctuata (Sowerby, 1832) – West America
 Anachis freytagi (Maltzan, 1884) – West Africa
 Anachis fulva Sowerby, 1832  – West America
 Anachis fusidens (W. H. Dall, 1908) – West America
 Anachis gaskoini P. P. Carpenter, 1857 – West America
 Anachis gracilis (C. B. Adams, 1852) – West America
 Anachis guerreroensis A. M. Strong & J. G. Hertlein, 1937 – West America
 Anachis hannana Hertlein & Strong, 1951
 Anachis incisa K. Monsecour & D. Monsecour, 2016
 Anachis inferiodentata K. Monsecour & D. Monsecour, 2016
 Anachis inopinatus K. Monsecour & D. Monsecour, 2018
 Anachis isabellei (d'Orbigny, 1839)
 Anachis juani Horro & Rolán, 2010
 Anachis jungi Faber, 2004
 Anachis kraussii (G.B. Sowerby I, 1844) – Indian Ocean
 Anachis leblondae Pelorce, 2020
 Anachis lentiginosa (R. B. Hinds, 1844) – West America
 Anachis lillianae Whitney, 1978 – West Mexico
 Anachis limula K. Monsecour & D. Monsecour, 2016
 Anachis lyrata Sowerby I, 1832 –  West America
 Anachis madagascarensis Bozzetti, 2019
 Anachis martinicensis Pelorce, 2013
 Anachis milium Dall, 1916
 Anachis miser (G.B. Sowerby I, 1844)
 Anachis moesta (C. B. Adams, 1852)  – West America
 Anachis nigricans (Sowerby, 1844) – West America
 Anachis nigrofusca P. P. Carpenter, 1857 – West America
 Anachis nisitella P. L. Duclos, 1840
 Anachis norfolkensis K. Monsecour & D. Monsecour, 2016
 Anachis oxillia (Duclos, 1846)
 Anachis pardalis R. B. Hinds, 1843 – West America
 Anachis pellucida Bozzetti, 2019
 Anachis phanea W. H. Dall, 1919 – West America
 Anachis pinguis K. Monsecour & D. Monsecour, 2016
 Anachis polyaulax K. Monsecour & D. Monsecour, 2016
 † Anachis problematica Laws, 1944 
 Anachis proclivis K. Monsecour & D. Monsecour, 2016
 Anachis profunda Pelorce, 2017
 Anachis ragivarui K. Monsecour & D. Monsecour, 2018
 Anachis rassierensis Smythe, 1985
 Anachis raysutana Smythe, 1985
 Anachis rechonchuda Lima & Guimarães, 2015
 Anachis reedi P. Bartsch, 1928 – West America
 Anachis remoensis (Gatliff & Gabriel, 1910)
 Anachis renatae Rios, 2009
 Anachis rhodae Radwin, 1968 – America
 Anachis richardi (Dautzenberg & Fischer, 1906)
 Anachis ritteri Hertlein & Strong, 1951 – West America
 Anachis roberti Monsecour & Monsecour, 2006
 Anachis rugosa (Sowerby, 1832) – West America
 Anachis rugulosa (Sowerby, 1844) – West America
 Anachis ryalli Rolan, 2005
 Anachis sanfelipensis Lowe, 1935 – West America
 Anachis scalarina (Sowerby, 1832) – West America
 Anachis sinaloa A. M. Strong & J. G. Hertlein, 1937 – West America
 Anachis spadicea (R. A. Philippi, 1846) – West America
 Anachis stricta (Watson, 1882)
 Anachis strix (Watson, 1882)
 Anachis strongi P. Bartsch, 1928 – West America
 Anachis teevani J. G. Hertlein & A. M. Strong, 1951 – West America
 Anachis terpsichore (G. B. Sowerby I, 1822) – India
 Anachis treva F. Baker, G. D. Hanna & A. M. Strong, 1938 – West America
 Anachis unidens Pelorce, 2020
 Anachis valledori Rolán & Luque, 2002
 Anachis varia (Sowerby, 1832) – West America
 Anachis varicosa (Gaskoin, 1852) – West America
 Anachis vermiculucostata Monsecour & Monsecour, 2009
 Anachis vexillum (L. A. Reeve, 1858) – West America
 Anachis xani Rolán & Gori, 2012 

The Indo-Pacific Molluscan Database lists the following species with names in current use:

 Anachis algoensis Sowerby, 1892
 Anachis alofa (Hedley, 1899)
 Anachis atkinsoni (Tenison Woods, 1876)
 Anachis dolicha (Verco, 1910)
 Anachis fulgida (Reeve, 1859)
 Anachis fuscolineata (Thiele, 1930)
 Anachis lightfooti Smith, 1901
 Anachis lurida Hedley, 1907
 Anachis marquesa (Gaskoin, 1852)
 Anachis milium Dall, 1916
 Anachis miser (Sowerby, 1844)
 Anachis smithi (Angas, 1877)
 Anachis sugillata (Reeve, 1859)
 Anachis vercoi (Thiele, 1930)

, the following species were mentioned in the database Shell-Bearing Mollusca:

 Anachis albella C. B. Adams, 1850 –  Caribbean
 Anachis albomarginata Okamoto & Habe, 1979 –  Japan
 Anachis almiranta Ch. Hedley, 1915 – Australia
 Anachis alternata A. A. Gould, 1860 – China
 Anachis amirantium Smith, 1879 – Japan
 Anachis antillarum L. A. Reeve, 1859 – West Indies
 Anachis atkinsoni J. E. Tennison-Woods, 1876 – Australia
 Anachis atomella P. L. Duclos, 1840 – Europe
 Anachis atrata A. A. Gould, 1860 – South Africa
 Anachis bicanaliferum Sowerby, 1832 West America
 Anachis brasiliana E. von Martens, 1897 – America
 Anachis calva Verco, 1910 – Australia
 Anachis cicinnata Montrouzier, 1860 – Japan
 Anachis cithara L. A. Reeve, 1859 – West America
 Anachis columnaria W. L. May, 1915 – Australia
 Anachis cophinodes H. Suter, 1908 –  New Zealand
 Anachis darwini G. F. Angas, 1877 –  Australia
 Anachis dautzenbergi Hervier, 1899  – Indo-Pacific
 Anachis descendens E. von Martens – West Africa
 Anachis diggelsi J. Brazier, 1874 – Australia
 Anachis divaricata H. A. Pilsbry, 1904 – Japan
 Anachis electona P. L. Duclos, 1840
 Anachis emergens Fischer-Piette & Nicklès, 1946 – Senegal
 Anachis enwrighti A. W. B. Powell, 1940 – New Zealand
 Anachis gemmulifera Ch. Hedley, 1907 – Australia
 Anachis gilva C. T. Menke, 1847 – West America
 Anachis gowllandi J. Brazier, 1874 –  Australia
 Anachis hahajimama H. A. Pilsbry, 1904 – Japan
 Anachis hannana J. G. Hertlein & A. M. Strong, 1951  – West America
 Anachis harpiformis Sowerby, 1832 –  West America
 Anachis intricata Ch. Hedley, 1912 – Australia
 Anachis io P. Bartsch, 1915 – South Africa
 Anachis iodostoma Gaskoin, 1852 –  Australia
 Anachis isabellei d'Orbigny, 1841 – East America
 Anachis japonica A. Adams, 1860 – Japan
 Anachis kirostra P. L. Duclos, 1840 -
 Anachis legrandi J. E. Tennison-Woods, 1876 – Australia
 Anachis liocyma H. A. Pilsbry, 1904 –  Indo-Pacific
 Anachis lyrata veleda P. L. Duclos, 1846 – Caribbean
 Anachis mariae A. W. B. Powell, 1940 –  New Zealand
 Anachis melvillei H. Strebel, 1905 – Southwest Atlantic
 Anachis minuscula A. A. Gould, 1862 – Japan
 Anachis misera californica L. A. Reeve, 1843 – Japan
 Anachis misera nigromaculata J. R. Tomlin 1915 – Japan
 Anachis misera plicatospira G. B. Sowerby III, 1915 – Japan
 Anachis misera polynyma H. A. Pilsbry, 1901 – Japan
 Anachis mitriformis A. Adams, 1860 – Indo-Pacific
 Anachis multicostata W. L. May, 1910 – Australia
 Anachis nanisca Herbier, 1899 – Japan
 Anachis nodicincta H. Suter, 1899 – New Zealand
 Anachis oerstedi E. von Martens, 1897  – West America
 Anachis plexa Ch. Hedley, 1901 – Australia
 Anachis pulchella H. de Blainville, 1829 – America
 Anachis pumila R. W. Dunker, 1860 – Indo-Pacific
 Anachis pygmaea Sowerby, 1832 – West America: synonym of Parvanachis pygmaea (G. B. Sowerby I, 1832)
 Anachis radwini Altena, 1975: synonym of Parvanachis obesa (C. B. Adams, 1845)
 Anachis regulus Souverbie, 1864 – Indo-Pacific
 Anachis savignyi F. P. Jousseaume in Mozzo, 1929 – Europe
 Anachis sinensis G. B. Sowerby III, 1894  -Indo-Pacific
 Anachis strenella P. L. Duclos, 1840
 Anachis subabnormis H. Suter, 1899 – New Zealand
 Anachis suffusa Sowerby, 1844 – Galápagos Islands
 Anachis teophania P. L. Duclos, 1846
 Anachis uncinata Sowerby, 1832 – West America
 Anachis validicosta T. Habe, 1960 – Indo-Pacific
 Anachis vivens A. W. B. Powell, 1934 – New Zealand
 Anachis yukitai T. Habe, 1991 – Japan

References

 Adams, H. & Adams, A. 1853. The genera of Recent Mollusca arranged according to their organization. London : John Van Voorst Vol. 1(Parts I-VIII) pp. 1–256, pls 1–32.

 
Gastropod genera